This is the list of Asian Games records in bowling.

Men

Women

References

 18th Asian Games – Games Records

Records
Bowling
Asian